Mihai Romilă (1 October 1950 – 27 June 2020) was a Romanian football midfielder.

International career
Mihai Romilă played 18 matches at international level for Romania, including appearances at Euro 1976 and 1980 qualifiers and at the World Cup 1978 qualifiers. He scored one goal from a penalty kick in a friendly which ended with a 2–1 loss against Greece. Romilă also played one game for Romania's Olympic team in a 1–0 victory against France at the 1976 Summer Olympics qualifiers.

Personal life
Mihai Romilă's brothers, Dumitru and Vasile were also footballers who played at Politehnica Iași.

Honours
Politehnica Iași
Divizia B: 1972–73, 1981–82

Notes

References

External links
Mihai Romilă at Labtof.ro

1950 births
2020 deaths
Romanian footballers
Olympic footballers of Romania
Romania international footballers
Association football midfielders
Liga I players
Liga II players
FC Politehnica Iași (1945) players
FCM Dunărea Galați players
People from Huși